Brasidas foveolatus is a species of stick insects from the family Heteropterygidae. Next to Brasidas samarensis it is one of the most famous representatives of the genus Brasidas.

Taxonomy 
Josef Redtenbacher described this species as Obrimus foveolatus in 1906 based on a male originally deposited in the Muséum national d'histoire naturelle. James Abram Garfield Rehn and his son John William Holman Rehn transferred the species in 1938/39 along with another species to the newly established genus Brasidas. In this they not only described four more new species, but with Brasidas foveolatus asper also a new subspecies of Brasidas foveolatus based on a single male. This male has been deposited as holotype in the National Museum of Natural History. It differs from the type specimen of the nominate subspecies, which has meanwhile been regarded as missing, in particular by the structuring on pro- and mesonotum, e.g. in the expression of spines and tubercles.

Description 
In habitus the species corresponds to typical representatives of the Obrimini e.g. Trachyaretaon or Obrimus species. As with all Brasidas species, Brasidas foveolatus also has a pair of characteristic holes in the metasternum. In both sexes, brown, more rarely olive-brown colors dominate. The more vividly drawn and more variable females can show light, mostly greenish areas, especially on the lateral and rear edge of the metanotum. Furthermore, numerous black tubercles on the head and the thorax are clearly differentiated from the brown base color. Often there is also an almost white area that extends from the middle of the sixth to almost the entire width of the seventh abdominal segment. There is almost always a pair of black spots on the eighth segment. With this combination of colors, the end of the abdomen, together with the ovipositor, is reminiscent of a head, more precisely a bird's head. Occasionally there are also females who wear a wide, white longitudinal band over the entire body on a brown background, which is then also supplemented by the black spots on the eighth segment of the abdomen. Adult males are mostly monochrome brown and like the females only slightly prickly.

Distribution, way of life and reproduction 
Brasidas foveolatus is native to the Philippine archipelago Mindanao.

Their eggshell (exochorion) is gray and becomes darker when the humidity is higher and lighter again when it is dry. The dorsal area is bulging and the lid (operculum), which is always dark gray sits on the egg, sloping towards the ventral side, so that an opercular angle of about 10 degrees is created. The nymphs hatch from the eggs after about four months and then need another four months to grow.

In terraristics 
The first representatives of this species found their way into the terrariums of enthusiasts in 2008. They came from Mindanao and were collected there in Nabunturan and at Lake Agko near Mount Apo. The species is listed under PSG number 301 by the Phasmid Study Group.

Brasidas foveolatus can easily be fed with leaves of bramble and other Rosaceae, as well as oak, ivy or Hypericum. Occasionally the forage plants should be sprayed with water. In order to enable eggs to be laid, the floor of the terrarium should be covered a few centimeters high with a slightly moist soil substrate.

Gallery

References

External links

Phasmatodea
Phasmatodea of Asia
Insects described in 1906